The Unity Movement (in Spanish: Movimiento Unidad, UNIDAD) is a political party coalition in El Salvador. The coalition was formed in 2013 by Former President Antonio Saca. The political parties that constituted the coalition include GANA,  National Conciliation Party, and the Christian Democratic Party.

Saca was the party's candidate for president in the 2014 presidential election.

External links

Unity Movement Official Website

Political parties in El Salvador
Political parties established in 2013